The Bonser Method is used to prioritize motions proposed in a democratic meeting. Voters cast Red, Yellow or Green votes for each motion. 
Red means "I understand this motion and am opposed to it", Green means "I understand this motion and am in favour of it", and, Yellow means either "I wish to learn more about this motion" or "I do not like this motion's present wording, but I think the concept has merit".

In a Bonser Method vote the proportion of green votes required to adopt a motion and the proportion of red votes required to reject a motion is more than 60% of votes cast. Motions voted yellow are typically sent to a workshop for refinement and improvement.

This method was named after its inventor, Canadian Greg Bonser.

References

Parliamentary procedure